"DM" is a song recorded by South Korean girl group Fromis 9 for their fourth extended play Midnight Guest. It was released as the lead single on January 17, 2022, by Pledis Entertainment. "DM" was written by Jo Su-jin and Gu Tae-woo, composed by Lee Woo-min "collapsedone", Justin Reinstein, Louise Frick Sveen, and Caroline Gustavsson, and arranged by Collapsedone, and Reinstein.

Background and release
On December 15, 2021, Pledis Entertainment announced that Fromis 9 would be releasing a new extended play in January 2022. On December 30, it was announced the extended play, titled Midnight Guest, would be released on January 17, 2022. A concept trailer was also released in the same day. On January 10, the track listing was released with "DM" announced as the lead single. On January 11, the highlight medley video for Midnight Night was released. On January 13, the sound source and portion of the choreography was released on TikTok.  On January 15 and 16, the teaser music video was released. The song, alongside its music video, was released on January 17.

Composition
"DM" was written by Jo Su-jin and Gu Tae-woo, composed by Yi U-min "collapsedone", Justin Reinstein, Louise Frick Sveen, and Caroline Gustavsson, and arranged by Yi U-min "collapsedone", and Justin Reinstein. Musically, the song is described as a pop song with "faint chord progression and funky bassline" with lyrics about "the excitement of the moment when Fromis 9, who succeeded in escaping at dawn, approaches the person [they] likes and boldly confesses [their] love". "DM" was composed in the key of B minor, with a tempo of 122 beats per minute.

Commercial performance
"DM" debuted at position 57 on South Korea's Gaon Digital Chart in the chart issue dated January 16–22, 2022. The song also debuted at position 3, position 175, and position 1 on Gaon Download Chart, Gaon Streaming Chart, and Gaon BGM Chart, respectively, in the chart issue dated January 16–22, 2022.

Promotion
Prior to the extended play's release, on January 17, 2022, Fromis 9 held a live event online and offline to introduce the extended play and communicate with their fans. Following the release of the extended play, the group performed "DM" on four music programs on the first week: MBC M's Show Champion on January 19, Mnet's M Countdown on January 20, KBS2's Music Bank on January 21, and SBS's Inkigayo on January 23. On the second week of the song's release, the group performed on SBS MTV's The Show on January 25, and MBC M's Show Champion on January 26, where they won first place in both appearances.

Credits and personnel
Credits adapted from Melon.

 Jo Su-jin – lyrics
 Gu Tae-woo – lyrics
 Lee Woo-min "Collapsedone" – composition, arrangement
 Justin Reinstein – composition, arrangement
 Louise Frick Sveen – composition
 Caroline Gustavsson – composition

Accolades

Charts

Weekly charts

Year-end charts

Release history

References

2022 songs
2022 singles
Hybe Corporation singles
Korean-language songs